Water Board Building may refer to:

in Australia
Sydney Water Head Office, also known as Water Board Building

in South Africa
Rand Water Board Building, Johannesburg

in the United States
Board of Water Commissioners Building, Denver, Colorado, also known as "Water Board Building", in Civic Center Historic District (Denver, Colorado)
Water Board Building (Detroit, Michigan)